Michał Przysiężny won in the final 7–6(5), 6–4 against Julian Reister.

Seeds

Draw

Finals

Top half

Bottom half

External links
Main Draw
Qualifying Draw

Kazan Kremlin Cup - Singles
2010 Singles
2010 in Russian tennis